Hall's Croft is a building in Stratford-upon-Avon, Warwickshire, England, which was owned by William Shakespeare's daughter, Susanna Hall, and her husband Dr John Hall whom she married in 1607.

The building is listed grade I, and now contains a collection of 16th- and 17th-century paintings and furniture.  There is also an exhibition about Doctor John Hall and the medical practices of the period. The property includes a dramatic walled garden which contains a variety of plant life that John Hall may have used in his treatments. John and Susanna Hall later moved to New Place, which William Shakespeare left to his daughter after his death.

References

External links
Hall's Croft - Hall's Croft official website

Shakespeare Birthplace Trust
Timber framed buildings in Warwickshire
Buildings and structures in Stratford-upon-Avon